Mercia Accident Rescue Service (or MARS) is a BASICS affiliated charity operation based on providing a fast-response, advanced medical team to back up the emergency services of the English counties of Herefordshire and Worcestershire. The charity aims to provide an organisational framework within which practitioners can be properly trained and equipped to provide prehospital care, its work is supported by local fundraisinghttps://www.herefordtimes.com/news/10642134.mercia-accident-rescue-service-mars-raising-money-for-ultrasound-machine-to-be-used-at-accident-scenes-across-herefordshire/.  MARS is staffed by a team of 11 doctors and two advanced clinical practitioners.

MARS responders assist at serious incidents such as road traffic collisions, industrial accidents, drownings, assaults, and critically unwell medical patients.

Equipment Carried

The typical equipment carried by a MARS responder includes:
Basic, intermediate and advanced airway: OP, NP, iGel, COETT, Surgical cricothyroidotomy kits.
Ventilatory support with EtCO2 monitoring: BVM, pressure control, EtCO2, portable ventilator.
Circualtion control: IV access, EZ-IO
Control of bleeding: Torniquets and haemostatic agents such as Hemcon/Celox, nasal haemostats and dental blocks.
Surgical equipment to perform; thoracostomy, thoracotomy, amputation
Diagnostic equipment to measure: BP, EtCO2, SpO2, Blood sugar, point of care ultrasound machine
A range of medications to provide sedation and analgesia

Notable Individuals

Prof Gavin Perkins - MBChB, MMEd, MD, FRCP, FFICM, FIMC RCSEd, FERC - Consultant in Critical Care Medicine
Assoc Prof Mr Richard Steyn - MS, MRCGP, DRCOG, FRCSEd, FIMC RCSEd - Past chairman of BASICS
Dr Malcolm Russell MBE, MBChB, DCH, DRCOG, MRCGP, FIMC RCSEd, FRGS
Mr Andrew Thurgood - MSc, DipHS, RGN, FIMC RCSEd - First Consultant Nurse in prehospital emergency medicine in the UK

See also
West Midlands Ambulance Service
Midlands Air Ambulance
West Midlands CARE Team
MARS Twitter

References

Rescue agencies